Christopher Taylor Guerrieri (born December 1, 1992) is an American professional baseball pitcher who is a free agent. He has played in Major League Baseball (MLB) for the Toronto Blue Jays and Texas Rangers. His nickname is Googy.

Career

Tampa Bay Rays
Guerrieri attended Spring Valley High School in Columbia, South Carolina. He committed to attend the University of South Carolina on a college baseball scholarship. The Tampa Bay Rays of Major League Baseball (MLB) selected him in the first round, with the 24th overall selection, of the 2011 MLB draft. He signed with the Rays, receiving a $1.6 million signing bonus. He pitched for the Hudson Valley Renegades of the Class A-Short Season New York–Penn League, pitching to a 1–2 win–loss record and a 1.04 earned run average (ERA) with 45 strikeouts and five walks in 52 innings pitched. Before the 2012 season, MLB.com rated Guerrieri as the 99th best prospect in baseball.

Guerrieri started the 2013 season with a 6–2 win–loss record and a 2.01 ERA in 14 games started with the Bowling Green Hot Rods of the Class A Midwest League. He was chosen to represent the Rays at the 2013 All-Star Futures Game. He reported fatigue in his arm in June and was given two weeks off. C. J. Riefenhauser replaced Guerrieri at the Futures Game. He then lasted only two innings after suffering elbow discomfort in his throwing arm. He underwent Tommy John surgery to repair a torn ulnar collateral ligament in his elbow on July 24, 2013. He received a 50-game suspension after the 2013 season, which he served while rehabilitating from surgery, for using a substance of abuse.

Guerrieri rehabilitated from his injury, with the expectation of being assigned to a minor league team by mid-May 2015. In May, he made his season debut with the Charlotte Stone Crabs of the Class A-Advanced Florida State League. The Rays promoted him to the Montgomery Biscuits of the Class AA Southern League during the season, and added him to their 40-man roster after the season.  He spent the 2016 season with Montgomery. Guerrieri was promoted to the Durham Bulls of the Class AAA International League for 2017. After making two starts, he suffered an elbow injury and did not appear in another game.

Toronto Blue Jays
On November 5, 2017, the Toronto Blue Jays acquired Guerrieri on waivers. He pitched for the Buffalo Bisons of the International League in 2018. The Blue Jays promoted him to the major leagues on September 1, 2018.  On November 2, 2018, Guerrieri cleared waivers and entered free agency.

Texas Rangers
On January 9, 2019, the Texas Rangers signed Guerrieri to a minor league contract with an invitation to spring training. He was assigned to the Triple-A Nashville Sounds to open the 2019 season. On July 16, the Rangers selected Guerrieri's contract. Guerrieri was designated for assignment on November 20, 2019. He accepted an outright assignment to Nashville on November 27. Guerrieri elected free agency after the 2020 season on October 1, 2020.

Seattle Mariners
On February 8, 2021, Guerrieri signed a minor league contract with an invitation to Spring Training with the Seattle Mariners. Guerrieri appeared in 22 games with the Triple-A Tacoma Rainers, recording a 4.61 ERA with 28 strikeouts. On August 12, 2021, Guerrieri was released by the Mariners.

Philadelphia Phillies
On August 24, Guerrieri signed a minor league contract with the Philadelphia Phillies. He was assigned to the Triple-A Lehigh Valley IronPigs. He elected free agency on November 7, 2021.

References

External links

1992 births
Living people
American expatriate baseball players in Canada
American people of Italian descent
Baseball players from Columbia, South Carolina
Bowling Green Hot Rods players
Buffalo Bisons (minor league) players
Charlotte Stone Crabs players
Durham Bulls players
Gulf Coast Rays players
Hudson Valley Renegades players
Major League Baseball pitchers
Montgomery Biscuits players
Nashville Sounds players
Tacoma Rainiers players
Texas Rangers players
Toronto Blue Jays players